David W. Courdin House, also known as the Old Courdin House, is a historic home  and national historic district located near Monett, Barry County, Missouri. It was built in 1876, and is a grouping of house and farm buildings associated with the Waldensian community.  They include the one-story, gable roofed stone dwelling, a usable cistern, well and vegetable cellar, the ruins of the original dairy barn and smokehouse.

It was added to the National Register of Historic Places in 1971.

References

Waldensianism
Historic districts on the National Register of Historic Places in Missouri
Houses completed in 1876
Buildings and structures in Barry County, Missouri
National Register of Historic Places in Barry County, Missouri